Donald Currie Caskie DD OBE OCF (22 May 190227 December 1983) was a minister in the Church of Scotland, best known for his work in France during World War II. He was a member of the Pat O'Leary escape line which helped up to 500 Allied sailors, soldiers and airmen to escape from occupied France (mainly through Spain).

The 'Fasti' – the record of all Church of Scotland ministers since the Reformation – simply mentions that he was "engaged in church and patriotic duties in France, 1939–1945". In his autobiography The Tartan Pimpernel he states that 'he had been called to Paris in 1935.'

Biography
The son of a crofter, he was born in Bowmore on Islay in 1902. He was educated at Bowmore School and then Dunoon Grammar School before studying arts and divinity at the University of Edinburgh. His first charge was at Gretna, before becoming the minister of the Scots Kirk in Paris in 1938. A 2001 Gaelic-language documentary aired on BBC2 stated that Caskie was a homosexual, with the documentarian Angus Peter Campbell saying that Caskie lived life as a man who was "straight at home [and] gay abroad".

Having denounced the evils of Nazism from the pulpit, following the German invasion of France in 1940 Caskie had to flee from Paris. Instead of trying to return home (as strongly advised by staff at the Church of Scotland Offices in Edinburgh) he fled south, eventually ending up in Marseilles on the French south coast (having refused the opportunity of a place on the last ship to Britain leaving Bayonne). At the British Seamen's Mission in Marseilles, Caskie set up a refuge for stranded Britons. He would even send telegrams to the Church of Scotland offices in Edinburgh informing them of the number of British service personnel who had escaped. With the help of Lt-Cmdr Pat O'Leary RN (later awarded the George Cross), British Intelligence, local clergyman Pastor Marcel Heuzé, the American consular authorities and others, Caskie helped as many as 500 Allied service personnel to flee France.

Detention
Caskie came under the suspicion of the Vichy France and German authorities, and a fellow Briton betrayed him. Pastor Heuzé was one of many to be executed. Lack of evidence saved Caskie's life for the first time; instead he received a suspended prison sentence and was ordered to leave Marseilles. This was partly helped by Caskie's ability to speak Gaelic, confounding his interrogators.

Caskie headed for Grenoble, where he was employed by the university, and acted as a chaplain for interned British soldiers and resident civilians. The Germans later ordered that all British-born civilians in the occupied countries be interned in Germany; Caskie managed to influence an Italian commandant to release many of them. Caskie was arrested again and spent some time in Italian custody at Sanremo, held in the old fortress prison. Later in 1943 he was transferred back to German custody and eventually put on trial in Fresnes, and sentenced to death. Awaiting execution by firing squad, Caskie asked to see a pastor. This saved his life; the German army padre Hans Helmut Peters successfully appealed to Berlin to spare Caskie. He then spent the rest of the war in a Prisoner of War camp, resuming his ministry in Paris after the war.

Scots Kirk
The Scots Kirk in Paris had been unused throughout the war, and lack of maintenance led to the church having to be rebuilt during the 1950s. To help pay for the rebuilding, his autobiographical account of his extraordinary wartime activities was published as The Tartan Pimpernel in 1957. The 1950s building proved to have serious defects and had to be again rebuilt in the late 1990s, Caskie's book being again reissued.

Later life
Caskie finally returned to Scotland as minister in Old Gourock Church.  In 1967 he became a minister at Wemyss Bay and Skelmorlie on the Firth of Clyde.

He was the subject of This Is Your Life in September 1959 when he was surprised by Eamonn Andrews in the foyer of the BBC Television Theatre.

He retired to Edinburgh in the early seventies and lived the final year of his life with his younger brother in Greenock. He died in 1983 and is buried at Bowmore on Islay. Various personal artefacts, including his wartime medals, can be seen at Kilarrow Parish Church, Bowmore.

Honours and awards

He was appointed an Officer of the Order of the British Empire (OBE) in June 1945 for services to the Forces in France.

He was honoured by the French government for his wartime service. The Alliance France-Ecosse society erected a memorial plaque at the rue de Forbin in Marseille, France.

On 26 October 2019 a memorial plaque marking his work was unveiled at the Fort de la Revere near Nice by the Le Devoir du Memoire organisation, which honours those affected by the war, including Resistance fighters.

In popular culture
In 2018, a play based on Caskie's book was written by Graeme Dallas and John Hughes.

Publications

References

External links
 

1902 births
1983 deaths
20th-century Ministers of the Church of Scotland
French Resistance members
People educated at Dunoon Grammar School
People from Islay
Alumni of the University of Edinburgh
Scottish activists
Scottish autobiographers
World War II prisoners of war held by Germany
Officers of the Order of the British Empire